North Ealing is a London Underground station on the Uxbridge branch of the Piccadilly line between Ealing Common and Park Royal. The station is located on Station Road, a short distance from the junction of Queen's Drive and Hanger Lane (A406, North Circular Road). It is in Travelcard Zone 3. West Acton station on the Central line is located about 550 metres to the east at the other end of Queen's Drive.

Despite its name, the station is geographically located to the east of Ealing Broadway; the areas of Gurnell, Pitshanger, Montpelier and Hanger Hill/Hanger Lane are more geographically suited to the term "North Ealing". There is even a primary school named North Ealing within Pitshanger.

History

North Ealing station was opened on 23 June 1903 by the District Railway (DR, now the District line) on its new extension from north of Ealing Common to Park Royal & Twyford Abbey (closed and replaced by Park Royal in 1931), where the Royal Agricultural Society's Park Royal show grounds had been recently opened. The line was opened fully to South Harrow on 28 June 1903.

This new extension was, together with the existing tracks between Ealing Common and Acton Town, the first section of the Underground's surface lines to be electrified and operate electric instead of steam trains. The deep-level tube lines open at that time (City & South London Railway, Waterloo & City Railway and Central London Railway) had been electrically powered from the start.

North Ealing was the only station on the South Harrow branch not rebuilt in the 1930s to the "Holden" style for the start of the Piccadilly Line service. As a result, it retains its slightly rural air. A 1930s railway sub-station is built alongside the Eastbound platform and is typical of the LPTB brick and concrete architectural style of the period.

On 4 July 1932 the Piccadilly line was extended to run west of its original terminus at Hammersmith sharing the route with the District line to Ealing Common. From Ealing Common to South Harrow, the District line was replaced by the Piccadilly line and, from this date, District line trains west from Ealing Common ran to Ealing Broadway only.

In 2018, it was announced that the station would gain step free access by 2022, as part of a £200m investment to increase the number of accessible stations on the Tube.

Services

The peak time service in trains per hour (tph) is:
12tph to Cockfosters (Eastbound)
6tph to Rayners Lane (Westbound)
6tph to Uxbridge via Rayners Lane (Westbound)

The off-peak service in trains per hour (tph) is:
6tph to Cockfosters (Eastbound)
3tph to Rayners Lane (Westbound)
3tph to Uxbridge via Rayners Lane (Westbound)

Connections
London Buses routes 112, 483 and night route N83 serve the station.

Gallery

References

External links

 
 
 
 

Tube stations in the London Borough of Ealing
Former Metropolitan District Railway stations
Railway stations in Great Britain opened in 1903
Piccadilly line stations
Grade II listed buildings in the London Borough of Ealing